The Rhems Formation, also called the Rhems Shale, is a geologic formation in South Carolina. The Rhems Formation is considered part of the Black Mingo Group. It was named after Rhems, SC which is located five miles from the type locality at Perkins Bluff. The unit is a light gray to black shale interlaminated with thin seams of fine-grained sand and mica with some layers partially silicified. It preserves fossils dating back to the Paleogene period.

See also

 List of fossiliferous stratigraphic units in South Carolina
 Paleontology in South Carolina

References
 
 

Paleogene geology of South Carolina